Charles-François Panard, or Pannard, (2 November 1689 – 13 June 1765) was an 18th-century French poet, chansonnier, playwright and goguettier

Selected works 

 1731: Le Tour de Carnaval, comedy in 1 act and in prose
 1737: Les Acteurs déplacés, comédy in 1 act and in prose
 1744: Les Fêtes sincères et l'heureux retour, comedy in 1 act in free verse
 1744: Pygmalion, one-act opéra comique
 1744: Roland, one-act opéra comique
 1746: Le Magasin des modernes, one-act opéra comique
 1747: L'Impromotu des acteurs, comedy in 1 act in free verse
 1747: Les Tableaux, comedy in 1 act in free verse
 1754: Zéphir et Fleurette, one-act opéra-comique, with Pierre Laujon and Charles-Simon Favart, (parody of Zélindor by François-Augustin de Paradis de Moncrif)
 1757: Le Nouvelliste dupé, one-act opéra comique
 1762: L'Écosseuse, one-act opéra comique, with Louis Anseaume, (parody of L'Écossaise by Voltaire)

See also 
 Calligram

References

Bibliography 
 Armand Gouffé, Notice sur Panard, en tête de l'édition des Œuvres choisies, 1803, 3 vol. in-18
 E. Junge, Pannard, Leipzig, 1901
 Marandet, Manuscrits inédits de la famille Favart, de Fuzelier, de Pannard, 1922
 Rizzoni, Nathalie, Charles-François Pannard et l'esthétique du petit, Oxford, Voltaire Foundation, SVEC 2000:01.

External links 
 His plays and their presentations on CÉSAR
  Two songs by Pannard (scores and tunes)

Sources 
 Gustave Vapereau, Dictionnaire universel des littératures, Paris, Hachette, 1876.
 Maurice Allem, Anthologie poétique française, XVIIIe siècle, Paris, Garnier Frères, 1919
 Cardinal Georges Grente (dir.), Dictionnaire des lettres françaises. Le XVIIIe siècle, nouvelle édition revue et mise à jour sous la direction de François Moureau, Paris, Fayard, 1995, (p. 999-1000).
 Charles-François Panard on Wikisource

18th-century French dramatists and playwrights
18th-century French poets
18th-century French male writers
French chansonniers
Writers from Normandy
1689 births
1765 deaths